Giacomo Sciacca (born 19 April 1996) is an Italian footballer who plays as a defender for  club Taranto.

Club career
Born in Desio, in the Province of Monza and Brianza (by-then part of the Province of Milan), Lombardy, to a father originary from Castelvetrano, Sciacca started his career at F.C. Internazionale Milano. On 21 July 2015 he was signed by Lega Pro club Renate. Sciacca made his professional debut on 14 August, in the first match of the 2015–16 Coppa Italia Lega Pro.

On 18 July 2016 he was loaned to Piacenza.

On 13 July 2017 Sciacca signed a three-year contract with Alessandria. In August 2018, he joined Imolese in a temporary deal.

On 4 October 2020 he joined Vibonese.

On 17 August 2021 he joined Foggia.

On 27 January 2023, Sciacca signed with Taranto until the end of the season.

International career
Sciacca finished as the runner-up with Azzurrini in the 2013 UEFA European Under-17 Championship. The team finished as the losing side of the round of 16 in the 2013 FIFA U-17 World Cup. He was in the team that was eliminated from the Elite Round of 2015 UEFA European Under-19 Championship qualification.

References

External links
 

1996 births
Living people
People from Desio
Sportspeople from the Province of Monza e Brianza
Footballers from Lombardy
Italian footballers
Italy youth international footballers
Association football central defenders
Inter Milan players
A.C. Renate players
Piacenza Calcio 1919 players
U.S. Alessandria Calcio 1912 players
Imolese Calcio 1919 players
U.S. Vibonese Calcio players
Calcio Foggia 1920 players
Taranto F.C. 1927 players
Serie C players